Kamile Suat Ebrem (born 21 June 1954), better known as Müjde Ar, is a Turkish film actress.

Biography 
She is the oldest daughter of the dramaturge and song writer Aysel Gürel. She left school at the age of 20, while she was pursuing a German Language and Literature M.A. at the Istanbul University. She played in Aşk-ı Memnu as bihter. At the age of 21, she married TV director Samim Değer and started to work as a model before taking part in Turkish B movies. After making about 100 B films & family comedy films between early 70s and early 1980s, her breakthrough came with the 1984 Yavuz Turgul film Fahriye Abla (Sister Fahriye). Fahriye Abla was the screen adaptation of Ahmed Muhip Dranas' poem of the same name.

Her portrayal of modern, sensual, independent, rebel woman in her films after Fahriye Abla won the hearts of Turkish filmgoers. It was considered a revolution in the relatively conservative mainstream Turkish cinema at that time, when females played mostly second fiddle roles. Mujde Ar then became the cult object of women cinema and the lead of many films by renowned Turkish directors Atıf Yılmaz, Halit Refiğ, Başar Sabuncu, Ertem Eğilmez. Her filmography includes Dul Bir Kadın (Widow), Dağınık Yatak (Messy Bed), Ahhh Belinda, Adı Vasfiye (Her Name Was Vasfiye), Asiye Nasıl Kurtulur (Who Can Save Asiye?), Asılacak Kadın (Woman to Be Hanged), Teyzem (Auntie), Karşılaşma (Encounter), Ağır Roman (Heavy Fiction).

In 2000s, Remakes of her films Aşk-ı Memnu, "Ah Belinda", "İffet", "Ağır Roman" sold internationally. She played in series "Şahsiyet" which won at International Emmy Awards.

Müjde Ar has received several major Turkish cinema awards, such as the Golden Orange in Antalya Film Festival and the Turkish Cinema Critics Association Best Actress Award. She has recently come into the public spotlight. Müjde Ar was the opening night presenter of Ankara Flying Broom Women's Film Festival in May 2005. She was reported recently to be working on a new film project to act along with Turkish pop music diva Sezen Aksu. This project seems to be frozen for the time being, however.

Through the late 1970s, she was the girlfriend of director Ertem Eğilmez. In 1980, she started her relationship with composer Atilla Özdemiroğlu that would last until 1995. Müjde Ar married politician Ercan Karakaş in 2005.

Theater 
 Varyemez (Cimri)
 Aç Koynunu Ben Geldim

Films 

 Bozkırda Deniz Kabuğu (2009) - Salur Hoca
 Kilit (2007) - Afife Jale
 Eğreti Gelin (2004) - İffet
 Komser Şekspir (2000) - Deniz
 Dar Alanda Kısa Paslaşmalar (2000) - Aynur
 Ağır Roman (1997) - Tina
 Yolcu (1994) - İstasyon şefinin karısı
 Aşk Filmlerinin Unutulmaz Yönetmeni (1990) - Konuk oyuncu
 Arabesk (1988) - Müjde
 Kaçamak (1987) - Suna
 Afife Jale (1987) - Afife Jale
 Aaah Belinda (1986) - Serap
 Asiye Nasıl Kurtulur (1986) - Asiye
 Kupa Kızı (1986) - Nilgün
 Asılacak Kadın (1986) - Melek
 Teyzem (1986) - Üftade
 Dul Bir Kadın (1985) - Suna
 Adı Vasfiye (1985) - Vasfiye
 Fahriye Abla (1984) - Fahriye
 Gizli Duygular (1984) - Ayşen
 Dağınık Yatak (1984) - Benli Meryem
 Şalvar Davası (1983) - Elif
 Güneşin Tutulduğu Gün (1983) - Sevgi
 Aile Kadını (1983) - Pınar
 Göl (1982) - Nalan
 İffet (1982) - İffet
 Ah Güzel İstanbul (1981) - Cevahir
 Deli Kan (1981) - Zekiye
 Feryada Gücüm Yok (1981) - Müge
 Çirkinler De Sever (1981) - Müjde
 Kır Gönlünün Zincirini (1980)- Ebru
 Aşkı Ben Mi Yarattım (1979) - Mehtap
 Şahit (1978)
 Güneşten de Sıcak (1978) - Arzu
 Kaybolan Yıllar (1978) - Çiğdem
 Töre (1978) - Zeynep
 Uyanış (1978) - Suzan
 Kibar Feyzo (1978) - Gülo
 Sarmaş Dolaş (1977) - Mine
 Vahşi Sevgili (1977) - Fadime
 Lanet / İlenç (1977) - Sibel
 Nehir (1977) - Hümeyra
 Günahın Bedeli / Tokat (1977) - Banu
 Kızını Dövmeyen Dizini Döver (1977) - Sevil
 Gülen Gözler (1977) - İsmet
 Tatlı Kaçık (1977) - Gül
 Deli Gibi Sevdim (1976) - Zeynep
 Selam Dostum (1976) - Ayşe
 Taşra Kızı (1976) - Macide
 Mağlup Edilemeyenler (1976) - Aysel
 Öyle Olsun (1976) - Alev
 Adalı Kız (1976) - Eda
 Gel Barışalım (1976) - Ümran
 Tosun Paşa (1976) - Leyla
 Köçek (1975) - Caniko
 Babacan (1975) - Ebru
 Baldız (1975) - Naciye Arnamus
 Batsın Bu Dünya (1975) - Seher
 Pisi Pisi (1975) - Ayşin 
 Sayılı Kabadayılar (1974) - Sanem

Series 
 Şahsiyet (2018)
 Aşk Ekmek Hayaller (2013)
 Benim Annem Bir Melek (2009) - Müjde Ar
 Kuşdili (2006) - Asiye
 Ayın Yıldızı (2006) - Asiye
 Serseri Aşıklar (2003) - Nevin
 Alacakaranlık (2003) - Nermin
 Karakolda Ayna Var (2000) - Cemile
 Aşk-ı Memnu (1975) - Bihter

References

External links 

1954 births
Actresses from Istanbul
Living people
Turkish film actresses
Best Actress Golden Orange Award winners
Golden Orange Life Achievement Award winners
20th-century Turkish actresses
21st-century Turkish actresses
Turkish television actresses
Turkish stage actresses